Dzagikavan is a village in the Kajaran Municipality of the Syunik Province in Armenia. In 1988 Armenian refugees deported from Azerbaijan settled in the village.

Municipal administration 
The village was a part of the community of Lernadzor until the June 2017 administrative and territorial reforms, when the village appeared as Dzagikavan as part of the Kajaran Municipality.

References 

Populated places in Syunik Province